Anastasia: The Mystery of Anna (Also titled Anastasia: The Story of Anna) is a 1986 American-Austrian-Italian made-for-television biographical film directed by Marvin J. Chomsky, starring Amy Irving, Rex Harrison (in his last performance), Olivia de Havilland, Omar Sharif, Christian Bale (in his first film) and Jan Niklas. The film was loosely based on the story of Grand Duchess Anastasia Nikolaevna of Russia and the book The Riddle of Anna Anderson by Peter Kurth. It was originally broadcast in two parts.

Plot
The film starts Part 1 in December 1916, at a lavish ballroom gathering just before the Russian Revolution, and moves to  the 1917 February Revolution, the family's forced exile to Siberia that summer after Nicholas II's forced abdication in March, the late 1917 Bolshevik Revolution, the communist takeover, the start of the Russian Civil War, and the July 1918 mass shooting of the Romanov family. The film then revolves around Anna Anderson, who believes that she is Anastasia Romanov, the daughter of Nicholas II of Russia. Anna first tells her story in the 1920s, when she was an inmate in a Berlin asylum after her suicide attempt. Her story of escaping from the Bolsheviks, who killed the rest of her family in 1918, seems so vivid that many Russian expatriates are willing to believe her. She slowly gains more trust, but Europe's Romanov exiles are very hesitant to believe her tale and send her away.

In Part 2, she travels to the United States branches of the family in New York City in 1928, and Nicholas's mother, Maria Feodorovna, dies in her native Denmark. America's expatriate Romanovs also eventually publicly denounce her as an impostor and coldly snub her at Feodorovna's funeral, which causes her to leave the country in 1931 to return to Germany. The film culminates in 1938 with Anna deciding to sue the Romanovs in German courts to force them to recognize her as Anastasia but never reveals if Anna really is Anastasia. The epilogue's narrator states that the court case ended in 1970 with Anna not being able to prove herself or to be disproven as Anastasia Romanov and that she eventually moved back to the United States and settled in Charlottesville, Virginia, where she died in 1984.

Cast

Amy Irving as Anastasia "Anna" Anderson
Olivia de Havilland as Dowager Empress Maria
Rex Harrison as Grand Duke Cyril Romanov
Jan Niklas as Prince Erich
Nicolas Surovy as Serge Markov
Susan Lucci as Darya Romanoff
Elke Sommer as Isabel Von Hohenstauffen
Edward Fox as Dr. Hauser
Claire Bloom as Czarina Alexandra
Omar Sharif as Czar Nicholas II
Jennifer Dundas as Grand Duchess Anastasia
Christian Bale as Tsarevich Alexei
Andrea Bretterbauer as Sonya Markov
Sydney Bromley as Herbert
Arnold Diamond as Dr. Markov
Carol Gillies as Sasha
Julian Glover as Colonel Kobylinski
Rachel Gurney as Grand Duchess Victoria
Betty Marsden as Princess Troubetskaya
Tim McInnerny as Yakovlev
Angela Pleasence as Clara
Julia Koehler as one of the three sisters

Awards

See also
 Romanov impostors
 Ipatiev House

References

External links

American television films
1986 television films
1986 films
Films directed by Marvin J. Chomsky
Cultural depictions of Nicholas II of Russia
Cultural depictions of Grand Duchess Anastasia Nikolaevna of Russia
Biographical television films
Films set in the 1910s
Films set in the 1920s
Films set in the 1930s
Films about amnesia
Films set in Russia
Films scored by Laurence Rosenthal